Dominic Michael McHale (born 18 February 1996) is an English professional footballer who plays as a midfielder for National League North club Gloucester City.

Playing career
McHale came through the Manchester City Academy before joining Barnsley on an 18-month contract in February 2014 after leaving City by mutual consent.

He joined Northwich Flixton Villa for a spell during the 2014–15 festive season.

He then joined Ramsbottom United in July 2015, having been released by Barnsley. The following month he was sent off for his part in a mass 22-man fight in a match against Buxton. In November he signed for Northwich Victoria, before moving to Northwich Manchester Villa during the 2015–16 festive period.

At the beginning of the 2016–17 season he appeared at least once for AFC Fylde's reserve team. He also played for Achyronas Liopetriou during the 2016–17 Cypriot Third Division season.

After playing on trial for Salford City he signed for the club in August 2017 and made his debut as a late substitute in a league match against Stockport County on 15 August. In February 2018 he joined Trafford on loan, before the following month moving, again on loan, to Hyde United, for whom he played six league matches.

After leaving Salford he joined Ashton United in August 2018. In March 2019 he joined FC United of Manchester, and left the following month.

On 30 August 2019 he joined League Two team Oldham Athletic having trained with them over the summer period. He made one brief appearance in the Football League, as a very late substitute in a 2–2 draw away to Plymouth Argyle on 7 September, and after three months, his contract was terminated by mutual consent. He joined Romford, but left again in January 2020.

In March 2020 he rejoined Ashton United, and later that year signed for National League North club AFC Telford United.

On 25 March 2022, McHale joined another National League North club, Darlington, on loan for the remainder of the 2021–22 season. McHale was released by AFC Telford United in June 2022. He signed for Radcliffe of the Northern Premier League Premier Division ahead of the 2022–23 season, and played three times before signing on loan for divisional rivals Matlock Town in September 2022. After a month, during which he made five league appearances, McHale returned to the National League North on a one-month loan at Gloucester City. He scored twice on debut as his new side beat Farsley Celtic 5–1. On 25 November 2022, McHale terminated his contract at Radcliffe by mutual consent, signing permanently for Gloucester City the following day on a deal until the end of the season. Four goals and four assists during January 2023 earned him the National League North Player of the Month award.

Statistics

References

External links

1996 births
Living people
Footballers from Manchester
English footballers
Association football midfielders
Barnsley F.C. players
Ramsbottom United F.C. players
Salford City F.C. players
Northwich Victoria F.C. players
Northwich Villa F.C. players
Trafford F.C. players
Hyde United F.C. players
Ashton United F.C. players
F.C. United of Manchester players
Southport F.C. players
Oldham Athletic A.F.C. players
South Shields F.C. (1974) players
Romford F.C. players
AFC Telford United players
Darlington F.C. players
Radcliffe F.C. players
Matlock Town F.C. players
Gloucester City A.F.C. players
Northern Premier League players
National League (English football) players
English Football League players
Expatriate footballers in Cyprus